Guy Mervin Charles Green OBE BSC
(5 November 191315 September 2005) was an English film director, producer, screenwriter, and cinematographer. In 1948, he won an Oscar as cinematographer for the film Great Expectations. In 2002, Green was given a Lifetime Achievement Award by the BAFTA, and, in 2004, he was named an Officer of the Order of the British Empire for his lifetime contributions to British cinema.

Biography 
Green was born in Frome, Somerset, England. He began working in film in 1929 and became a noted film cinematographer and a founding member of the British Society of Cinematographers. Green became a full-time director of photography in the mid-1940s, working on such films as David Lean's Oliver Twist in 1948.

About 1955, Green switched to directing, and he moved to Hollywood around 1962. In addition to directing A Patch of Blue (1965), Green also wrote and co-produced the film. After his death, his widow Josephine told AP that it was his proudest accomplishment.  Among his other films as director are The Angry Silence (1960), The Mark (1961) (nominated for the Palme d'Or at the Cannes Film Festival), Jacqueline Susann's Once Is Not Enough (1975), and The Devil's Advocate (1977).

Green died in his Beverly Hills home from kidney and heart failure, aged 91. In addition to his wife of 57 years, he was survived by his son, Michael; his daughter, Marilyn Feldman; and two grandchildren.

Works

Selected filmography 

 Song of the Plough (1933) aka Country Fair - clapper boy
 Radio Parade of 1935 (1934) - camera operator
 The Limping Man (1936) -camera operator
 The Price of Folly (1937) - camera operator
 Glamorous Night (1937) - camera operator
 The Spell of Amy Nugent (1941) aka Spellbound - camera operator 
 Pimpernel Smith (1941) - camera operator
 In Which We Serve (1942) - camera operator
 One of Our Aircraft Is Missing (1942) - camera operator
 Escape to Danger (1943) - cinematographer
 The Way Ahead (1944) aka Immortal Battalion - cinematographer
 This Happy Breed (1944) - camera operator
 The Way to the Stars (1945) - 2nd unit
 Carnival (1946) - cinematographer, writer
 Great Expectations (1946) - cinematographer
 Take My Life (1947) - cinematographer
 Blanche Fury (1948) -cinematographer
 Oliver Twist (1948) - cinematographer
 The Passionate Friends (1949) - cinematographer
 Adam and Evalyn (1949) - cinematographer
 Madeleine (1950) -cinematography
 Night Without Stars (1951) - cinematography
 Captain Horatio Hornblower (1951, cinematographer)
 The Hour of 13 (1952, cinematographer)
 The Story of Robin Hood and His Merrie Men (1952, cinematographer)
 Decameron Nights (1953) - cinematography
 The Beggar's Opera (1953) - cinematography
 Rob Roy: The Highland Rogue (1953) - cinematography
 Cocktails in the Kitchen (1954) - cinematography
 Souls in Conflict (1954) - cinematography
 River Beat (1954) - director
 Postmark for Danger (1955) aka Portrait of Alison - writer, director
 The Warriors (1955) aka The Dark Avenger - cinematography
 I Am a Camera (1955) - cinematography
 Lost (1955) aka Tears for Simon - director)
 House of Secrets aka Triple Deception (1956) - director
 Sea of Sand (1958) aka Desert Patrol - director
 The Snorkel (1958, director)
 SOS Pacific (1959) - director)-
 The Angry Silence (1960, director)
 ITV Play of the Week - episode "Hallelujah Corner" (1961) - writer
 The Mark (1961, director)
 Light in the Piazza (1962, director)
 Diamond Head (1963, director)
 55 Days at Peking (1963) - director, uncredited
 A Patch of Blue (1965) - director, writer, producer
 Pretty Polly (1967) - director
 The Magus (1968) - director
 A Walk in the Spring Rain (1969) - director
 Luther (1974) - director
 Jacqueline Susann's Once Is Not Enough (1975, director)
 The Devil's Advocate (1977, director)
 The Incredible Journey of Doctor Meg Laurel (1979, director)
 Jennifer: A Woman's Story (1979) (TV movie) - director
 Jimmy B. and Andre (1980) (TV movie) - director
 Inmates: A Love Story (1981) (TV movie) - director
 Isabel's Choice (1981) (TV movie) - director
 Strong Medicine'' (1987) (TV Movie) - director

External links 

1913 births
2005 deaths
People from Frome
BAFTA winners (people)
Best Cinematographer Academy Award winners
British cinematographers
Deaths from kidney failure
English film directors
English male screenwriters
Officers of the Order of the British Empire
20th-century English screenwriters
20th-century English male writers